The Princess Diaries, Volume IV: Princess in Waiting, released in the United Kingdom as The Princess Diaries: Mia Goes Forth, is a young adult book in the Princess Diaries series.  Written by Meg Cabot, it was released in 2003 by Harper Collins Publishers and is the fourth book in the series.

Plot

Never before has the world seen such a princess.

Nor have her own subjects, for that matter. Mia's royal introduction to Genovia has mixed results: while her fashion sense is widely applauded, her position on the installation of public parking meters is met with resistance.

But the politics of bureaucracy are nothing next to Mia's real troubles. Between canceled dates with her long-sought-after royal consort, a second semester of the dreaded Algebra, more princess lessons from Grand-mère as a result of the Genovian parking-meter thing, and the inability to stop gnawing on her fingernails, isn't there anything Mia is good at besides inheriting an unwanted royal title?

Reviews
Whether or not Mia ever achieves her much-sought-after "self-actualization," teens will enjoy reading her over-the-top, up-to-the-minute-hip diary. --Karin Snelson at Amazon.com 

Meg Cabot continues the hilarious adventures of Mia Thermopolis, a very ordinary teenager whose life takes an extraordinary turn when she learns she's the heir apparent to the throne of Genovia, a small European country. In this third installment of The Princess Diaries, Mia's self-deprecating wit, self-absorption, and adolescent angst are as entertaining as ever as she struggles with the realization that despite being a princess, she isn't guaranteed any fairy-tale endings. ...While Mia's sometimes simplistic view of life remains intact and her adolescent shallowness is often apparent, she also shows an evolving maturity as she prepares for her royal role under Grand-mère's overbearing guidance. But never fear, the seriousness is kept in balance with plenty of fun, tons of laughs, and several amusing disasters. And, if Mia isn't careful, she might even get that fairy-tale ending. --Beth Amos, The Barnes & Noble Review

References

External links

Reviews at Barnes & Noble website

2003 American novels
American young adult novels

The Princess Diaries novels
HarperCollins books